Albert La Verne Fabrique (December 23, 1887 in Clinton, Michigan – January 10, 1960 in Ann Arbor, Michigan), was a professional baseball player who played shortstop for the 1916–1917 Brooklyn Robins.

He later managed the minor league Vicksburg Hill Billies in 1926 & 1927.

External links

1887 births
1960 deaths
Major League Baseball shortstops
Brooklyn Robins players
Baseball players from Michigan
Minor league baseball managers
Jackson Convicts players
Fort Wayne Railroaders players
Providence Grays (minor league) players
Fort Wayne Champs players
Toledo Iron Men players
Los Angeles Angels (minor league) players
Seattle Rainiers players
Kansas City Blues (baseball) players
Springfield Senators players
Vicksburg Hill Billies players
Tecumseh (minor league baseball) players